Animal Magic is the debut studio album by British electronic musician Bonobo. It was originally released in 2000 on Tru Thoughts and re-released in 2001 by Ninja Tune.

Track listing
All songs were mixed by Bonobo (Simon Green).

Critical reception
Animal Magic received both mixed and positive reviews upon release. AllMusic gave the album a 2.5/5, stating that the album "slowly builds its way into a steady and enjoyable debut". Pitchfork gave the album a score of 7.6/10, praising Bonobo (aka Simon Green) "for his smooth and calming sound, but detrimental use of previous Ninja Tune and Tru Thoughts records".

References

External links
 

Bonobo (musician) albums
2000 debut albums
Ninja Tune albums